William Clifford may refer to:

 William Clifford (priest) (died 1670), English Roman Catholic theologian
 William Clifford (cricketer) (1811–1841), English cricketer
 William H. Clifford (1862–1929), Ohio politician
 W. H. Clifford (William H. Clifford), writer, director, and film company head
 William Clifford (actor) (1877–1941), American actor of the silent era
 William Clifford (bishop) (1823–1893), English prelate of the Roman Catholic Church
 William Kingdon Clifford (1845–1879), mathematician and philosopher
 William Clifford Heilman (1877–1946), American composer
 Billy Clifford (soccer), American professional soccer player
 Billy Clifford (footballer) (born 1992), English professional footballer